Rick Wohlhuter (born December 23, 1948) is a retired American middle-distance runner.

Wohlhuter won the national indoor championship in the 600 yards in 1970. He graduated from the University of Notre Dame in 1971, and later qualified for the 1972 and 1976 Olympics. In 1976 he finished sixth in the 1500 meters. In the  800 metres, he was initially disqualified for bumping Seymour Newman in the semi-final, but reinstated on appeal and went on to win the bronze medal, behind Alberto Juantorena who broke the world record and Ivo Van Damme of Belgium.

Wohlhuter was the U.S. national champion for the 800 meters in 1973 and 1974 and was ranked #1 in the world both years by Track & Field News.  Also in 1974, Wohlhuter won the first of three indoor 1000 yard U.S. national titles, set a world record in the 880 yards at 1:44.10 (1:43.5 at 800 meters), and a world record in the 1000 meter event at 2:13.9, which remains the longest standing American outdoor record.  He won the James E. Sullivan Award as the nation's top amateur athlete for his achievements in 1974.

Wohlhuter retired in 1977. He contemplated a comeback in 1980, but reconsidered after learning about the American boycott of the Moscow Olympics. He began working in the insurance business instead.

References

External links
 
 Wohlhuter at the 1976 US. Olympic Trials  @ 29:25

1948 births
Living people
People from St. Charles, Illinois
American male middle-distance runners
Olympic bronze medalists for the United States in track and field
Athletes (track and field) at the 1972 Summer Olympics
Athletes (track and field) at the 1976 Summer Olympics
World record setters in athletics (track and field)
James E. Sullivan Award recipients
Notre Dame Fighting Irish men's track and field athletes
Medalists at the 1976 Summer Olympics
Track & Field News Athlete of the Year winners